Harrison Township is a township in Franklin County, Kansas, USA.  As of the 2000 census, its population was 445.

Geography
According to the USGS, it contains two cemeteries: Fouts and Roselawn.

The streams of Rock Creek and Sac Branch run through this township.

Transportation
Harrison Township contains one airport or landing strip, Ottawa Municipal Airport.

References
 USGS Geographic Names Information System (GNIS)

External links
 US-Counties.com
 City-Data.com

Townships in Franklin County, Kansas
Townships in Kansas